Kevin Michael McHale (born June 14, 1988) is an American actor, singer, and dancer. Formerly one of the two lead vocalists of the boy band NLT, McHale is best known for his role as Artie Abrams in the Fox musical comedy-drama series Glee, for which he was nominated for a Grammy Award, three Screen Actors Guild Award for Outstanding Performance by an Ensemble in a Comedy Series and two Teen Choice Awards. From 2014 to 2016, he hosted the British panel show Virtually Famous on E4. In 2019, McHale and Glee co-star Jenna Ushkowitz began a podcast called Showmance, where they recap Glee episodes and interview Glee cast and crew members, as well as other people. The podcast was rebranded in 2022 as And That’s What You Really Missed on iHeartRadio.

Early life
McHale was born in Plano, Texas to Christopher McHale and Elizabeth Payne, the youngest of four children. His older sister is a talent agent, and he got his start in acting by convincing her to let him audition for a local commercial. He grew up with actor and singer Demi Lovato.  He moved to California with his parents as a teenager in order to pursue a career in the entertainment industry. McHale attended Academy of the Canyons High School in the Santa Clarita Valley in California.

Career

Music
Before becoming an actor, McHale joined the American four-member boy band NLT, which stands for "Not Like Them" as one of two lead singers. They were discovered by Chris Stokes in 2006, who subsequently signed them to his label, The Ultimate Group. On March 13, 2007, they released their first single, "That Girl". The following month, they opened (with Chantelle Paige) for The Pussycat Dolls. The band also made a guest appearance in the film Bratz: The Movie as an auditioning band. While in the group, McHale, along with Timbaland and his bandmates, co-wrote the song "She Said, I Said (Time We Let Go)". On April 30, 2009, member Travis Michael Garland announced that NLT had split.

McHale, who has a record deal with Universal Music Group, writes original music in his spare time. In an interview with Mario Lopez, McHale stated that he plans to pursue solo music post-Glee. In 2015, McHale, Chris Moy, and Justin Thorne co-wrote the song "Heartless" which was featured on the latter's debut EP The Heartbreaker. That same year, he starred in the music video for Thorne's song "Summer Nights". In April 2019, McHale released the pop song "Help Me Now", directed by Justin Thorne. The accompanying music video stars McHale and actor Nolan Gould. McHale described the video as having "a bootleg kinda gay Wes Anderson vibe." In June 2019, he released the song "James Dean". The accompanying music video stars McHale and Pose actor Johnny Sibilly.

In 2019, McHale released his first solo album, Boy.

Also in 2019, he competed in The X Factor: Celebrity, in which he finished in seventh place.

In 2021, McHale (with Chris Moy, Shelby Rabara, Justin Thorne, and Jenna Ushkowitz) began production on a musical children's show called The AlphaBeatZ. McHale voices Ross, one of the five animated teddy bear characters. A five-song Christmas EP was released on December 17, 2021. McHale is credited as co-writer of the three original songs on the EP.

Acting

In 2007, McHale made a guest appearance on NBC's comedy series The Office in the season four episode "Launch Party", portraying a pizza delivery boy who is taken hostage by Michael Scott (Steve Carell). He guest starred in three episodes of Nickelodeon's teen drama series Zoey 101 as Dooley Fibadoo. In 2008, McHale guest starred in two episodes of HBO's dark fantasy drama series True Blood, appearing as Neil Jones, a coroner's assistant.

In 2009, McHale landed his breakout role as Artie Abrams in the Fox musical comedy-drama series Glee. His character, who uses a wheelchair after a car accident, joins the McKinley High glee club in the first episode. He had his first solo performance on the show when he sang "Dancing with Myself" in the episode "Wheels". In the episode "Dream On", he danced in a fantasy sequence to "The Safety Dance", and sang "Dream a Little Dream of Me". In the second-season episode "Britney/Brittany", he sang a solo (in a dream sequence) of "Stronger", after being anaesthetized for dental surgery. He also danced in a dream sequence alongside Harry Shum, Jr. to Michael Jackson's song "Scream" in the third-season episode "Michael". McHale, along with the main cast of the series, was nominated for the Screen Actors Guild Award for Outstanding Performance by an Ensemble in a Comedy Series four times, winning in 2010.

In 2010, McHale appeared briefly in One Call's music video "Blacklight" alongside former NLT bandmate Justin Thorne, who was a member of One Call. In June 2011, McHale appeared in Katy Perry's music video for her song "Last Friday Night (T.G.I.F.)" as the character Everett McDonald. On July 22, 2012, McHale co-hosted the 2012 Teen Choice Awards with Demi Lovato. In January 2014, it was reported that McHale would host a comedy panel show, Virtually Famous, for the British digital television channel E4. The show features comedian Seann Walsh and radio presenter Chris Stark as series regulars and team captains.

On February 24, 2014, it was announced that McHale had signed on to play a supporting role in the Kathy Bates and Dustin Hoffman led independent film Boychoir. McHale's character, Wooly, is a young music teacher who helps a troubled young boy at his school. In July 2014, it was announced that he and Aaron Tveit had signed on to star in the comedy film They Might Be Kennedys, but the film was postponed indefinitely in 2015 after the production was failed to be cast in time. McHale was cast to play one of the leads, Teddy Mulligan. In 2015, McHale competed with his mother, father, sister, and uncle on Celebrity Family Feud against Fred Willard. In April 2016, McHale joined the cast of Dustin Lance Black's drama miniseries When We Rise as AIDS activist Bobbi Campbell.

In December 2020, McHale was a part of a mini musical music video called "Stay Inside". He co-starred alongside dancer Haley Fitzgerald. The song and video were written by the composers of the Broadway and West End musical Six, Toby Marlow and Lucy Moss. The video was choreographed by Kyle Hanagami. Viewers were encouraged to make donations to Broadway Cares/Equity Fights AIDS, the philanthropic heart of Broadway.

On June 3, 2021 Ryan Murphy revealed McHale to be one of four actors starring in the upcoming spin-off series American Horror Stories. McHale starred alongside Dyllón Burnside of Pose, Charles Melton of Riverdale, and Nico Greetham of The Prom. Murphy announced the new cast via Instagram post where he dubbed the four men the Fantastic Four. The new series premiered on Hulu July 15, 2021 and concluded on Halloween. McHale played the role of Barry, a member of the fictional social media influencer group "The Bro House", in the fourth episode of the anthology series which was titled "The Naughty List".

In December 2021, McHale was a part of an off-Broadway workshop for Radiant Baby, a musical about artist Keith Haring, where he was cast as Haring. The workshop was postponed due to a surge in Covid-19 cases. The production was originally set to run at Two River Theater in Red Bank, New Jersey from June 4–26, 2022, but was ultimately canceled.

Radio and podcast 
Beginning in 2014, McHale and Glee co-star Amber Riley hosted a radio show on Dash Radio called McRiley. The show aired on Fridays at 3 PM PST/6 PM EST, but went on indefinite hiatus in 2015 due to their busy filming schedules for Glee. McHale went on to become one of the four hosts of Sick of My Own Voice on Dash Radio in 2015. The other hosts included his NLT bandmate and longtime roommate Justin Thorne, songwriter and photographer Brittany Burton, and YouTuber Amy Lynn Thompson. The four have been friends since high school. The show aired on Thursdays at 1 PM PST/4 PM EST.

In 2019 Kevin McHale and former Glee co-star Jenna Ushkowitz launched the podcast Showmance to discuss their on-screen and offline relationship. One of the most requested discussion topics of Season 1 of the podcast was their time on Glee. In season 2 they started an in-depth recap of Glee Season 1. Each episode featured McHale and Ushkowitz re-watching episodes of Glee and sharing behind-the-scenes secrets while also sharing personal sentiments and reflections about filming. The podcast was part of the LadyGang network on PodcastOne. The podcast started an indefinite hiatus in July 2020 following the death of Naya Rivera.

In September 2022, McHale and Ushkowitz announced their new podcast endeavor And That's What You Really Missed on iHeartRadio. Their rebranded and reimagined Glee recap podcast will start at the beginning, recapping and sharing memories from all six seasons of the show.

Personal life
In September 2012, McHale and his dog Sophie appeared in a PETA ad campaign, promoting the adoption of shelter animals. In June 2016, the Human Rights Campaign released a video in tribute to the victims of the 2016 Orlando gay nightclub shooting, in which McHale and other celebrities told the stories of the people killed there. In September 2016, he co-created the mobile app +ONE, created with the intent to "provide people with one app to simplify the process of creating events."

McHale resides in the Hollywood Hills. He is a Los Angeles Dodgers fan.

In April 2018, McHale came out as gay with a tweet. He is in a relationship with actor Austin P. McKenzie. McHale and McKenzie met on the set of When We Rise and have been in a relationship since 2016.

McHale is a member of the Democratic Party. He publicly supported the presidential campaigns of Barack Obama in 2012, Hillary Clinton in 2016, and Joe Biden in 2020.

Filmography

Film

Television

Music videos

Video games

Awards and nominations

Discography

EP
 Boy (2019)
The AlphaBeatZ Christmas (2021)

References

External links

 

1988 births
Living people
21st-century American male actors
American male film actors
American male pop singers
American male television actors
American male voice actors
American male dancers
American people of Irish descent
American contemporary R&B singers
American dance musicians
American soul singers
American tenors
Capitol Records artists
Male actors from Texas
LGBT people from Texas
American gay actors
American gay musicians
NLT (band) members
People from Plano, Texas
Roc Nation artists
Singers from Texas
21st-century American singers
20th-century LGBT people
21st-century LGBT people